This is a list of ARIA Club Chart number-one hits from 2007, which is collected from Australian Recording Industry Association (ARIA) from weekly DJ reports.

Chart

Number-one artists

See also
ARIA Charts
List of number-one singles of 2007 (Australia)
List of number-one albums of 2007 (Australia)
2007 in music

References

2007
Australia Club Chart
2007 in Australian music